"Face Without a Name" is a song by Australian rock group Kisschasy, released as the second single from their debut album, United Paper People (2005). It was released on 24 October 2005 and peaked at number 41 in Australia.

Music video
The music video featured the camera panning across an orange background while the band performed. The video also featured various fans acting as extras for the shoot.

Track listing

Charts

Release history

References

2005 singles
2005 songs
Eleven: A Music Company singles
Kisschasy songs
Song recordings produced by Phil McKellar